The Aprilia SX50 is a street motorcycle sold by Aprilia since 2006. It is powered by a D50B0 single-cylinder two-stroke engine with a nikasil-lined cast-iron cylinder manufactured by Derbi.

Engine 
The engine in the Aprilia SX 50 is sourced from Derbi/Piaggio. This engine was used in the Derbi Senda DRD/X-Race/X-Treme supermotos, as well as the Derbi GPR 50 and Aprilia RS 50 road bikes. Engine parts from the bikes supermotos can be directly swapped with one another, there are some small differences between the road bike and supermoto engine which ceases the transfer of some external engine parts (exhaust, airbox).

References 
 

SX 50